The 1976 New Mexico State Aggies football team was an American football team that represented New Mexico State University in the Missouri Valley Conference during the 1976 NCAA Division I football season. In their fourth year under head coach Jim Bradley, the Aggies compiled a 4–6–1 record. The team played its home games at Memorial Stadium in Las Cruces, New Mexico.

Schedule

References

New Mexico State
New Mexico State Aggies football seasons
Missouri Valley Conference football champion seasons
New Mexico State Aggies football